Amer Šašivarević (born 8  October 1994) is a Bosnian-American professional footballer who plays as a defender.

Career

Early and collegiate
Šašivarević grew up playing club soccer in Salt Lake City before being picked up by the Real Salt Lake youth academy in Casa Grande, Arizona. Where he found himself as a highly recruited athlete picking up interest from schools in the Pac-12 Conference, West Coast Conference and Western Athletic Conference.

Šašivarević accepted an offer to play four years of college soccer at Grand Canyon University between 2013 and 2017. for Petar Draksin and Schellas Hyndman.

While at college, Šašivarević appeared for USL PDL side Lane United FC during their 2016 season.

Professional
On 21 January 2018, Šašivarević was selected 57th overall in the 2018 MLS SuperDraft by FC Dallas. However, he was not signed by the club and spent 2018 with USL PDL side Ogden City SC.

On 15 January 2019, joined USL Championship side Oklahoma City Energy.

Personal life
Šašivarević was born in Munich, Germany to Bosnian parents who had fled the Bosnian War. The family emigrated to Utah in the United States

References

External links
 
 

1994 births
Living people
German footballers
Soccer players from Utah
Footballers from Munich
Association football defenders
Grand Canyon Antelopes men's soccer players
USL Championship players
USL League Two players
Lane United FC players
OKC Energy FC players
FC Dallas draft picks
German expatriate footballers
German expatriate sportspeople in the United States
Expatriate soccer players in the United States